Altından geçme (literally: "Do not pass under") is a gate in the city wall of Tarsus, Mersin Province, Turkey, originally part of a Roman bath.

Geography 
Tarsus is situated in Çukurova (ancient Cilicia) between Adana and Mersin. The bath is located in the urban fabric of Tarsus.

History 
The bath was built in the 2nd or 3rd century during the Roman Empire. It was a big complex, most of which was destroyed during the earthquakes in the 6th century. The unaffected eastern part of the building was later used as a glass workshop during the Byzantine Empire.

Details
The building material is rubble stone and the cement is Khorosan mortar. The bath used the water from Berdan River (ancient Cydnus), which was close by. However, because of constant floods, Byzantine Emperor Justinian I (reigned 527-565) had a channel constructed at the east of the city to facilitate easier flow. A part of the southern wall was bored during the construction of an urban road. The popular name of the gate is Altından geçme ("Do not pass under") referring to insecure appearance of the gate.

References

External links 
 (for Tarsus history)
 (for images)

Ancient Roman buildings and structures in Turkey
Archaeological sites in Mersin Province, Turkey
Tarsus, Mersin
Cilicia (Roman province)
City gates